Scott Richard Hoying (born September 17, 1991) is an American singer, musician and songwriter who came to international attention as the baritone of the a cappella group Pentatonix and one-half of the music duo Superfruit. As of June 2021, Pentatonix has released eleven albums (two of which have been number ones) and two EPs, have had four songs in the Billboard Hot 100, and won three Grammy awards as "the first a cappella group to achieve mainstream success in the modern market". , Superfruit's YouTube channel has over 2.4 million subscribers, and over 444 million views.

Early life and education 
Scott Richard Hoying was born in Arlington, Texas, to Connie and Rick Hoying. He met Mitch Grassi, another co-founder of Pentatonix, and his partner in the duo Superfruit, when he was young. He also met Kirstin Maldonado, another Pentatonix founder, while they were both attending Martin High School. Hoying and Grassi were both active in theater arts in Arlington and met when they were cast in the musical Annie, they both also play piano. They were "giggly" together but not best friends immediately; they then were split up being sent to different schools for a year and a half, and reunited while performing in Charlie and the Chocolate Factory. After graduating high school, he briefly attended the University of Southern California, where he studied popular music performance.

Pentatonix started as a trio, as Hoying, Grassi, and Maldonado had been in choir for most of their high school careers. The three quickly put together an a cappella cover of Lady Gaga's 2010 "Telephone" featuring Beyoncé to compete in a local radio station contest to meet Glee cast members. They did not win but kept competing and performing, gaining popularity.

Hoying heard about The Sing-Off reality-show competition for a cappella acts; he gained an interest in the genre once in college. It was the first time the three really embraced a cappella. The show required groups to have five or more members, so they recruited bass vocalist Avi Kaplan and singer/beat boxer Kevin Olusola. After they won, they all relocated to Los Angeles to pursue recording artist careers. The main goal of the group was to become the first modern mainstream a cappella group, which they have done.

Career

Pentatonix 
Pentatonix is a quintet a cappella collective, with most of their songs being covers, and much of their success comes from touring, including internationally. They gained national attention in the U.S. competing on NBC's a cappella reality show The Sing-Off in 2011, which they won. The group got a record label, who dropped them as their audience was too niche—with no guarantee of selling albums, or concert tickets—but the group felt it was ultimately advantageous as around late 2012 Pentatonix started posting videos to YouTube building an international fan base. Pentatonix also released the debut EP, PTX, Volume 1, on their new label in June 2012, followed by a Christmas EP, PTXmas in November. They recorded covers of pop 40 hits like Gotye's "Somebody That I Used to Know" (2011), Psy's "Gangnam Style" (2012), and Fun's "We Are Young" (2011). Their big video hit was a November 2013 video doing a medley of Daft Punk songs, it had ten million views in the first week of its release and rose to over 150 million views; as of January 2020 it has over 320 million views.

As of March 2015 they had 7.6 million YouTube subscribers, that rose to seventeen million as of October 2019, and in December 2020, 18.9 million; with over three billion video views. As of February 2020, they had over 4.4 billion views; they also have two million followers on Instagram, and 3.6 million on Facebook.

They continually release YouTube videos, with nearly every one with more than a million views. They also tour extensively including across North America, Europe, Asia, and Latin America—over an estimated forty countries as of December 2016; and have had cameos in shows and movies like Bones and Pitch Perfect 2 (2015); and their own television show, A Pentatonix Christmas Special (2016).

As of June 2021, Pentatonix has released eleven albums, ten of which reached the Top Ten on the Billboard 200, all combined selling ten million albums—including two number one albums, and five of Christmas music—and have had four songs in the Billboard Hot 100, and won three Grammy awards. Their three Grammy wins were for their: Daft Punk medley tribute to the French electronic music duo (2015); version of Pyotr Ilyich Tchaikovsky's "Dance of the Sugar Plum Fairy" (2016); Jolene collaboration with Dolly Parton (2017). In addition to their regular tours, they utilize their extensive holiday music for Christmastime tours. Their That's Christmas to Me (2014) is the highest-charting Christmas album by a group of two or more since 1962.

The individual members find inspiration to cover recent songs, as well as international classics, then if they decide as a group it is a good match, they compose an arrangement; their friend Ben Bram, who is also their producer, is their co-arranger.  Although they are known for their covers and re-arranged popular songs, the band released their first album, Pentatonix, in October 2015, and it was all original music; it also marked the first time an a cappella group had the top album on the Billboard 200 album chart. Their sold-out North American tour that year was documented in the movie, On My Way Home. Grassi noted he and Hoying both being openly gay has been appreciated by the group's fans; a common demographic is midwesterners and Christians who comment that the pair have helped them accept their LGBTQ children.

Superfruit 

Hoying and Mitch Grassi, lifelong friends, vlogged skits, comedy videos, and duets to YouTube quickly gaining a following; after hundreds of videos they saw the music ones were the most liked so created Superfruit. Some of their viral videos include: Frozen medley (with more than thirteen million views as of April 2016) ; an "Evolution of Miley Cyrus" (12.8 million) and a Beyoncé album medley (with over twelve million). According to Hoying, Superfruit "came from Mitch's random mind". Hoying noted, "Our first rule with starting Superfruit was: This is for fun, ... This is to be free and do whatever we want. So, let's write stories that we want to write, let's make videos that we want to make, let's not put limitations on it. And not care so much about calculating it to where we think it might be more successful ... And I think that's why it feels so good to the fans."  The first Superfruit video was released on August 13, 2013. Navigating Pentatonix versus the duo's projects and touring schedules was simplified by the quintet's rule that the larger groups' commitments come first.

They started to incorporate original music into the project, starting in 2016. Superfruit's first EP, Future Friends, Part One, was released in June 2017, Part Two in September 2017, followed by a full-length album of the same name. The EP's concept is that a friendship can run even deeper than any romantic component. They wrote with songwriters and producers collaborators including Robopop, Justin Tranter, and John Hill; and produced videos for each song. The album won critical acclaim and rose to ninth place on the Billboard 200 album chart.

Superfruit's debut video for Future Friends, "Imaginary Parties", was noted by InStyle for the bold fashions that their stylist Candice McAndrews helped them secure. McAndrews has worked with Pentatonix since the beginning as well. She used Gucci and Balenciaga to elevate with high-fashion inspiration and "a pop art approach to their look". McAndrews shared that a Superfruit fitting will have seven to nine racks of clothing for each, including designers "Alexander Wang, Loewe, Vetements , Haider Ackermann, Raf Simons, and Maison Margiela".

Acapop! KIDS

In October 2019, Hoying started another a cappella group, with members who are aged 17 years or younger, calling the group Acapop! KIDS.

On August 18, 2020, 15 year-old member Nolan Gibbons (one of the group's beatboxers) passed away in his sleep from sudden unexplained death in childhood. In his memory, Acapop! KIDS put together a memorial video of Nolan's audition song, This City by Sam Fischer.
The group also auditioned for  America's Got Talent in 2022, where they sang Nolan's original song “My Turn”. Heidi Klum, Sofia Vergara, and Simon Cowell all voted “yes” for Acapop! (Howie Mandel was sick, so he could not attend), sending them to the next round.

Personal life 
Hoying has been in a relationship with model Mark Manio since 2017. Hoying proposed to Manio on the beach in The Bahamas on April 14, 2022. He resides in Hollywood.

Discography

Pentatonix

Superfruit

Studio albums

Extended plays

Singles

Features

Solo

Studio albums

Singles

Features

Filmography

Television

Awards and nominations

Notes

References

1991 births
Living people
People from Arlington, Texas
American LGBT singers
American LGBT songwriters
LGBT people from Texas
American gay musicians
Pentatonix members
20th-century LGBT people
21st-century LGBT people
Singer-songwriters from Texas
LGBT YouTubers
Gay singers
Gay songwriters
American pianists
American pop pianists